The 1932 VFL Grand Final was an Australian rules football game contested between the Richmond Football Club and Carlton Football Club, held at the Melbourne Cricket Ground in Melbourne on 1 October 1932. It was the 34th annual Grand Final of the Victorian Football League, staged to determine the premiers for the 1932 VFL season. The match, attended by 69,724 spectators, was won by Richmond by a margin of 9 points. Richmond were competing in their fifth Grand Final in six years, and after losing the previous four, finally claimed their third VFL/AFL premiership victory.

Score

Teams

 Umpire - Bob Scott

Statistics

Goalkickers

See also
 1932 VFL season

References
1932 VFL Grand Final statistics from the AFL Tables
 The Official statistical history of the AFL 2004 
 Ross, J. (ed), 100 Years of Australian Football 1897-1996: The Complete Story of the AFL, All the Big Stories, All the Great Pictures, All the Champions, Every AFL Season Reported, Viking, (Ringwood), 1996.

External links
Games you may have missed: State Library of Victoria Australian Rules research guide

VFL/AFL Grand Finals
Grand
Richmond Football Club
Carlton Football Club
October 1932 sports events